Robert Shirley (c. 1581–1628) was an English traveller and adventurer.

Robert Shirley may also refer to:

 Robert Shirley, 4th Baronet (1629–1656), royalist conspirator
 Robert Shirley, 1st Earl Ferrers (1650–1717), English peer and courtier
 Robert Shirley (FRS) (1673–1699), English intellectual and politician
 Robert Shirley, Viscount Tamworth (1692–1714), British courtesy viscount and MP
 Robert Shirley (MP) (1700–1738), British politician
 Robert Shirley, 6th Earl Ferrers (1723–1787), British peer
 Robert Shirley, 7th Earl Ferrers (1756–1827), British peer and antiquary
 Robert Shirley, 12th Earl Ferrers (1894–1954), British peer and politician
 Robert Shirley, 13th Earl Ferrers (1929–2012), British peer and politician
 Robert Shirley (died 1956), American airline pilot involved in 1956 Grand Canyon mid-air collision
 Robert Shirley (footballer) (born 1980), Australian rules footballer